The 55th Wing is a United States Air Force unit assigned to Air Combat Command.  The wing is primarily stationed at Offutt Air Force Base, Nebraska, but maintains one of its groups and associated squadrons at Davis-Monthan Air Force Base, Arizona, as a geographically separated unit.

The 55 WG is the only Air Force wing with continuous operations, maintenance, and aircraft presence in the United States Central Command area of responsibility since Operation Desert Storm.

The wing's mission is to provide worldwide reconnaissance, real-time intelligence, command and control, information warfare and combat support to U.S. leaders and commanders.  One of the wing's units, the 55th Operations Group, operates 46 aircraft, including 13 models of seven different types.  It is the largest wing in Air Combat Command and flies the most diverse number of aircraft.

History
 For additional history and lineage, see 55th Operations Group
The "Fightin' Fifty-Fifth" has made significant contributions to the defense of the United States of America for more than 50 years.  Since its inception, the unit has operated around the world, flying a wide variety of aircraft.

Cold War
On 1 November 1950, the 55th Strategic Reconnaissance Wing (55 SRW) was activated under the Wing Base Organization at Ramey Air Force Base, Puerto Rico, as the headquarters for the 55th Strategic Reconnaissance Group and its supporting units.  From 1950 to 1954 the Wing's task was to perform strategic reconnaissance, charting photography, precise electronic geodetic mapping, and electronic reconnaissance missions. In 1952, the wing moved to Forbes Air Force Base, Kansas, and converted to Boeing RB-50 Superfortresses.  On 13 March 1953, a wing RB-50 flying out of Eielson Air Force Base, Alaska, was attacked by Soviet Mikoyan-Gurevich MiG-15 fighters near Siberia, but was able to ward off the fighter's attack with defensive fire.  The United States protested the attack, stating the plane was on a weather reconnaissance flight over international waters, 25 miles from the Kamchatka Peninsula.  The Soviets responded by saying the plane was intercepted over their territory near Cape Krestovoi.  A little more than three months later, on 29 July 1953 an RB-50 of the wing's 343d Strategic Reconnaissance Squadron was shot down by Soviet fighters about ninety miles south of Vladivostok.  The Soviet Union did not deny the plane's location was over water, but claimed that the bomber had twice flown over Soviet territory and fired on their MiGs, who then returned fire defensively.

The wing formally assumed a global strategic reconnaissance mission in 1954 and transitioned to the RB-47E "Stratojet." The Wing was deployed at Ben Guerir Air Base, in what was then French Morocco, between May and August 1955.

When the mapping and charting functions originally assigned to the 55th Reconnaissance Group were transferred on 1 May 1954, the wing assumed the mission of global strategic reconnaissance, including electronic reconnaissance. It also carried out weather reconnaissance operations until June 1963, and photographic reconnaissance missions until May 1964.

The 55 SRW moved to Offutt Air Force Base, Nebraska, in August 1966.  That same year the 55th's 38th Strategic Reconnaissance Squadron assumed responsibility for SAC's airborne command and control system.  The 2d Airborne Command and Control Squadron inherited this mission after activation in April 1970.  The 1st Airborne Command and Control Squadron, flying E-4A aircraft, transferred to the 55th on 1 November 1975, bringing with it the National Emergency Airborne Command Post, now called the National Airborne Operations Center. The Wing flew reconnaissance operations during the U.S. military operations in Grenada in 1983 and Libya in 1986. On 1 March 1986, the 55 SRW became the host unit at Offutt after the inactivation of the 3902d Air Base Wing.

The Wing ended nearly twenty-five years of continuous Airborne Command Post ('Looking Glass') operations in 1990, assumed a modified alert posture, and continued worldwide reconnaissance. In October 1998, the wing transferred control of the EC-135 LOOKING GLASS mission to the United States Navy's TACAMO aircraft and the 7th Airborne Command and Control Squadron, which flew the EC-135 LOOKING GLASS aircraft, inactivated.

The wing deployed a Rivet Joint RC-135 from Hellenikon Air Base, Greece, to Riyadh Air Base, Saudi Arabia, on 8 August 1990, and began 24-hour-a-day reconnaissance of the region two days later for Central Command Commander Gen. Norman Schwarzkopf, under Operation Desert Shield.  At the start of Operation Desert Storm, 18 January 1991, the wing continued to provide real-time information.  In 1996, this operation moved to Prince Sultan Air Base, Saudi Arabia.  On 9 August 2015, the wing celebrated 25 years of what is believed to be the longest continuous deployment by an Air Force unit.

Current operations
The 55th Strategic Reconnaissance Wing became the 55th Wing on 1 September 1991, to reflect the wing's performance of a diversity of missions.  When SAC disestablished and Air Combat Command (ACC) established, the wing transferred to ACC and gained its fifth operational location.

The 55th SRW and the 55th Wing has been awarded the USAF's P. T. Cullen Award five times since 1971 for its contributions to photo and signal intelligence collection.

Aircraft and crews from the unit have at times temporarily relocated to the nearby Lincoln Air National Guard Base when Offutt's runway has been closed for repairs.

Mission 
The 55th Operations Group is Air Combat Command's largest group, has operational control over 12 squadrons and two detachments worldwide. It employs 46 aircraft, including 13 models of seven different types.

The 55th Communications Group provides worldwide command, control, communications and computer (C4) systems, information management and combat support to war-fighting and national leadership. It also provides communications technology and support to the 55th Wing and 44 tenant units.

Combat-ready EC-130H Compass Call aircraft, crews, maintenance and operational support to combatant commanders is provided by the 55th Electronic Combat Group, based Davis Monthan Air Force Base, Arizona

Operations are supported by the 55th Maintenance Group which provides centralized direction of all maintenance staff functions providing support to world-wide aircraft reconnaissance missions. The 55th Medical Group serves 50,000 beneficiaries with extensive outpatient clinic capabilities and ancillary support and the 55th Mission Support Group provides vital mission support for Offutt Air Force Base through engineering, security, mission support, services, supply, transportation, contracting and deployment readiness programs.

Component units and assigned aircraft 
Unless otherwise indicated, units are based at Offut AFB, Nebraska, and subordinate units are located at the same location as their commanding group.

55th Wing Staff

 55th Comptroller Squadron

55th Operations Group

 38th Reconnaissance Squadron – RC-135V/W Rivet Joint
 45th Reconnaissance Squadron – RC-135U Combat Sent, WC-135W Constant Phoenix
 55th Intelligence Support Squadron
 55th Operations Support Squadron
 82d Reconnaissance Squadron (Kadena AB, Japan) – RC-135
 95th Reconnaissance Squadron (RAF Mildenhall, United Kingdom) – RC-135
 97th Intelligence Squadron
 338th Combat Training Squadron – TC-135
 343rd Reconnaissance Squadron – RC-135V/W Rivet Joint
 390th Intelligence Squadron
 488th Intelligence Squadron

55th Communications Group

 55th Cyber Squadron
 55th Strategic Communications Squadron

55th Electronic Combat Group (Davis-Monthan AFB, Arizona)

 41st Electronic Combat Squadron – EC-130H Compass Call
 42nd Electronic Combat Squadron – EC-130H Compass Call
 43rd Electronic Combat Squadron – EC-130H Compass Call
 755th Aircraft Maintenance Squadron
 755th Operations Support Squadron

55th Maintenance Group

 55th Aircraft Maintenance Squadron
 55th Maintenance Squadron

55th Medical Group

 55th Aerospace Medicine Squadron
 55th Dental Squadron
 55th Medical Operations Squadron
 55th Medical Support Squadron

55th Mission Support Group

 55th Civil Engineering Squadron
 55th Contracting Squadron
 55th Force Support Squadron
 55th Logistics Readiness Flight
 55th Security Forces Squadron

Lineage
 Established as the 55th Strategic Reconnaissance Wing on 29 June 1948
 Activated on 19 July 1948
 Inactivated on 14 October 1949
 Redesignated 55th Strategic Reconnaissance Wing, Medium on 27 October 1950
 Activated on 1 November 1950
 Redesignated: 55th Strategic Reconnaissance Wing on 16 August 1966
 Redesignated: 55th Wing on 1 September 1991

Assignments

 311th Air Division, 19 July 1948 – 14 October 1949
 Second Air Force, 1 November 1950
 21 Air (later, 21 Strategic Aerospace) Division, 1 October 1952
 Attached to 5th Air Division, 18 May-16 August 1955
 810th Strategic Aerospace Division, 1 September 1964
 12th Strategic Aerospace Division, 2 July 1966
 14 Strategic Aerospace (later, 14 Air) Division, 30 June 1971
 4th Air Division, 1 October 1976
 57th Air Division, 1 April 1980
 12th Air Division, 1 October 1982
 14th Air Division, 1 October 1985
 Second Air Force, 1 September 1991
 Twelfth Air Force, 1 July 1993
 Eighth Air Force, 1 October 2002
 Twelfth Air Force, 1 October 2009
 Twenty-Fifth Air Force, 1 October 2014
 Sixteenth Air Force, 11 October 2019 – present

Components
Groups
 55th Strategic Reconnaissance Group (later 55th Operations Group): 19 July 1948 – 14 October 1949; 1 November 1950 - 16 June 1952; 1 September 1991 – present
 55th Electronic Combat Group: 3 February 2003 – present

Squadrons
 1st Airborne Command and Control Squadron: 1 November 1975 – 6 October 2016
 1st Strategic Reconnaissance Squadron (Provisional): attached 1 September-9 October 1948
 1st Strategic Reconnaissance Squadron: attached 10–26 October 1948; attached 14 January-1 June 1949
 2d Airborne Command and Control Squadron: 1 April 1970 – 19 July 1994
 7th Airborne Command and Control Squadron: 19 July 1994 – 1 October 1998
 23d Strategic Reconnaissance Squadron: attached 1–17 June 1949
 38th Reconnaissance: attached 6 January 1951 – 15 June 1952, assigned 16 June 1952 – 1 April 1970; assigned 1 April 1979 – Present. 
 24th Reconnaissance Squadron, 7 July 1992 – 30 June 1994
 45th Reconnaissance Squadron, 1 July 1994 – Present
 55th Air Refueling Squadron: attached 8 January 1951 – 15 June 1952, assigned 16 June 1952 – 18 February 1954; assigned 1 October 1955 – 15 March 1963 (detached 31 October-27 December 1956)
 55th Mobile Command and Control Squadron: 1984-29 September 2006
 82d Reconnaissance Squadron: 2 October 1991 – present
 97th Intelligence Squadron: ?–present
 323d Strategic Reconnaissance Squadron: attached 19 September-10 October 1949
 338th Strategic Reconnaissance Squadron: attached 25 November 1950 – 15 June 1952, assigned 16 June 1952 – 15 June 1963; assigned 25 March-25 December 1967
 343d Strategic Reconnaissance Squadron (later 343d Reconnaissance Squadron): attached 19 July-26 October 1948; attached 4 January 1951 – 15 June 1952, assigned 16 June 1952 - Present.
 390th Intelligence Squadron ?–present
 488th Intelligence Squadron?–present
 548th Strategic Missile Squadron: attached 1–31 August 1964, assigned 1 September 1964 – 25 March 1965
 922d Reconnaissance Squadron: 1 June 1992 – 30 June 1994

Stations
 Topeka Air Force Base (later Forbes Air Force Base), Kansas, 19 July 1948 – 14 October 1949
 Ramey Air Force Base, Puerto Rico, 1 November 1950
 Forbes Air Force Base, Kansas, 5 October 1952
 Offutt Air Force Base, Nebraska, 16 August 1966 – present

Aircraft and missiles

 B/RB-17 Flying Fortress, 1948–1949
 B/RB-29 Superfortress, 1948–1949; 1950-1951
 RC-54 Skymaster, 1948
 RB-50 Superfortress, 1950–1954
 EB/RB-47 Stratojet, 1954–1967
 KC-97 Stratofreighter, 1956-?
 SM-65 Atlas, 1964–1965
 EC-135, 1966–1998
 KC-135 Stratotanker, 1966–1998
 RC-135, 1967–present

 Boeing E-4, 1975–2016
 C-135, 1977–1994
 NKC-135, 1983–1994
 TC-135, 1988–present
 T-38, 1992–1995
 WC-135, 1992–present
 C-21: 1993-1997
 OC-135: 1994–present
 EC-130 Hercules, 2002–present

See also
 List of B-29 units of the United States Air Force
 List of B-50 units of the United States Air Force 
 List of B-47 units of the United States Air Force

References

Notes
 Explanatory notes

 Citations

Bibliography

External links
 Offut Air Force Base units - 55th Wing
 55th Wing Fact Sheet
 USAF Aircraft Serial Number Search
 "A Tale of Two Airplanes" by Kingdon R. "King" Hawes, Lt Col, USAF (Ret.)

0055
Military units and formations in Nebraska